Francescopaolo D'Angelosante (1922–1997) was an Italian politician. From 1969–1984, he served as a Member of the European Parliament (MEP). He was a member of the Communist Party of Italy. From 1983–1984 he served as Vice-Chair of the  Delegation for relations with the Member States of ASEAN and the ASEAN Interparliamentary Organisation (AIPO)

References

1922 births
1997 deaths
MEPs for Italy 1979–1984
People from Pescara
Italian Communist Party MEPs